NDM may refer to:

 National Democratic Movement (disambiguation)
 National Democratic Movement (Bosnia and Herzegovina)
 National Democratic Movement (Guatemala)
 National Democratic Movement (Jamaica)
 National Democratic Movement (Pakistan)
 National Moravian-Silesian Theatre (NDM), Ostrava Czech Republic
 Naturalistic decision-making, in psychology
 Ndam language (ISO 639:ndm)
 Neonatal diabetes mellitus
 New Deal Movement, a political party in Liberia
 New Delhi metallo-beta-lactamase 1, an enzyme
 Network Data Mover, original name of Connect:Direct software
 Non-denominational Muslim